Amazonomyces is a lichenized genus of fungi in the family Arthoniaceae.
The genus contains 3 species:
 Amazonomyces farkasiae (Lücking) Lücking, Sérus. & G. Thor, 1998
 Amazonomyces palmae Bat. & Cavalc., 1963
 Amazonomyces sprucei (R. Sant.) Lücking, Sérus. & G. Thor, 1998

References

Arthoniaceae
Arthoniomycetes genera
Lichen genera